Infestdead Records is an independent record label from India, and the first metal record label from Northeast India. The label was founded in 2012 by Rik Namchoom of Unholy Maunder.

Music
The label distributed Sons of Malice (2012) by the British NWOBHM band Savage, in India.

Album
 Sons of Malice (2012) – Savage

Current personnel
Producer – Rik Namchoom
Co-producer and sound engineer – Dika Rante
AR – Aditya Jarial
Assistant AR – Kallol Bordoloi
PR Manager – Chintan Zalani

(Last updated: August 2012)

References

External links
 Infestdead Records on Facebook
 Label's Weblink

Record labels established in 2012
Heavy metal record labels
Death metal record labels
Black metal record labels
Thrash metal record labels
Indian record labels